Micronectidae is a family of water boatmen often referred to as pygmy water boatmen. They were originally classified as a subfamily under Corixidae but were raised to family level by Nieser (2002).

There are two subfamilies, Micronectinae with 6 genera and Synaptogobiinae with one genus.

Subfamilies and genera
 Micronectinae
 Austronecta Tinerella, 2013
 Micronecta Kirkaldy, 1897
 Monogobia Nieser & Chen, 2006
 Papuanecta Tinerella, 2008
 Synaptonecta Lundblad, 1933
 Tenagobia Bergroth, 1899
 Synaptogobiinae
 Synaptogobia Nieser & Chen, 2006
Data sources: i = ITIS, c = Catalogue of Life, g = GBIF, b = Bugguide.net

References

Further reading